Diacopa or Diakopa was a town in the west of ancient Pontus, inhabited in Hellenistic and Roman times. The town gave its name to a region of Pontus called the Diacopene.

Its site is tentatively located near Gümüşhacıköy, Asiatic Turkey.

References

Populated places in ancient Pontus
Former populated places in Turkey
Roman towns and cities in Turkey
History of Amasya Province